"What Will Mary Say" is a song written by Eddie Snyder and Paul Vance.  It was originally performed and issued as a single by Mark Dinning in 1961, but did not chart. Two years later, the song was recorded and released by Johnny Mathis, who made the song a popular hit.  Mathis' version of "What Will Mary Say" (arranged by Don Costa and produced by Ernie Altschuler) reached #3 on the adult contemporary chart, #9 on the U.S. pop chart, #21 on the U.S. R&B chart, and #49 on the UK Singles Chart in 1963.

The song is about an affair, in which the singer wants to end it, fearing that his original lover would be angry and walk out on him. This song features the sounds of a spoken woman, repeatedly pleading: "Don't Go".

The song ranked #65 on Billboard magazine's Top 100 singles of 1963.

Other versions
Lawrence Welk released a version of the song on his 1963 album 1963's Early Hits.
Joey Powers released a version of the song on his 1964 album with Bobby Bare and Roy Orbison entitled Special Delivery from Bobby Bare...Joey Powers...Roy Orbison.
Jay Black released a version of the song as a single in 1967, but it did not chart.
Gene Thomas released a version of the song as a single in 1967, but it did not chart.
David Geddes released a version of the song on his 1975 album Run Joey Run.
Barry Biggs released a version of the song on his 1976 album Mr. Biggs.

References

1961 songs
1963 singles
1967 singles
Songs written by Eddie Snyder
Songs written by Paul Vance
Songs about infidelity
Johnny Mathis songs
Columbia Records singles
United Artists Records singles